Amanda Palmstierna (born 1977) is a Swedish politician. From October 2019 to September 2022, she served as Member of the Riksdag representing the constituency of Stockholm County. She became a member after Gustav Fridolin resigned.

References 

Living people
1977 births
Place of birth missing (living people)
21st-century Swedish politicians
21st-century Swedish women politicians
Members of the Riksdag 2018–2022
Members of the Riksdag from the Green Party
Women members of the Riksdag